Gheverzeh (also Romanized as Ghoorzeh) is a village in Kushk-e Nar Rural District, Kushk-e Nar District, Parsian County, Hormozgan Province, Iran. At the 2006 census, its population was 458, in 65 families.

References 

Populated places in Parsian County